Anesthesia or anaesthesia has traditionally meant the condition of having the perception of pain and other sensations blocked. In some countries, the term is also used to mean anesthesiology.

Anesthesia may also refer to:

Music 
Anesthesia (album), a 1995 album by Fun People
Anesthesia, a 1992 album by Premature Ejaculation
"Anesthesia", the sixth track on the album Against the Grain (1990) by Bad Religion
"Anesthesia", the thirteenth track on the album Life Is Killing Me (2003) by Type O Negative
"(Anesthesia) Pulling Teeth", the fifth track (an instrumental by Cliff Burton) on the album Kill 'Em All (1983) by Metallica

Other 
Anesthesia (2015 film), a 2015 film
Anesthesia (1929 film), a 1929 German silent film
Anaesthesia (journal), a medical journal

See also
Anastasia (disambiguation)